Nacho Libre is a 2006 sports comedy film directed by Jared Hess and written by Jared and Jerusha Hess and Mike White. It stars Jack Black as Ignacio, a Catholic friar and lucha libre fan who secretly moonlights as a luchador to earn money for the orphanage where he works. The film is loosely based on the story of Fray Tormenta ("Friar Storm", a.k.a. Rev. Sergio Gutiérrez Benítez), a real-life Mexican Catholic priest who had a 23-year career as a masked luchador to support the orphanage he directed. The film was produced by Black, White, David Klawans and Julia Pistor.

The film was released on June 16, 2006, by Paramount Pictures. It received mixed reviews from critics and grossed $99.3 million at the worldwide box office against its $35 million production budget.

Plot

Ignacio's parents, a Scandinavian Lutheran missionary and a Mexican deacon, both died while he was still a baby. Now a cook for the Oaxaca monastery orphanage where he was raised, Ignacio dreams of becoming a luchador, but wrestling is strictly forbidden by the monastery as it is considered a sin of vanity. Though Ignacio cares deeply for the orphans, he is unable to provide decent meals for them due to a lack of funds. He also struggles with his feelings for Sister Encarnación, a nun who has just arrived to teach at the orphanage. One night, while collecting a bag of tortilla chips for the orphans, Ignacio gets mugged for the chips by a street thief named Steven. Having had enough, Ignacio decides to disregard the monastery's rules and become a luchador to make money. He convinces Steven to join him by promising to share the prize money if they win, and the two join a local competition as tag partners.

Ignacio fights with the moniker "Nacho" to keep his identity secret, while Steven adopts the name "Esqueleto" (skeleton). They get defeated in their first match but still get paid nicely, as wrestlers are entitled to a portion of the total revenue. 
They prove popular with the crowd so are invited back.
They continue to wrestle every week, with Ignacio using the money to acquire better food for the orphans but becoming frustrated that the duo can never achieve victory in the ring. Ignacio tries everything he can think of, including a folk remedy to acquire the powers of an eagle, but success still eludes the two. He then seeks advice from champion luchador Ramses, who arrogantly rebuffs his attempts at conversation.

Undeterred, the duo infiltrates a party Ramses's manager holds for the best wrestlers. Steven climbs over a wall to get inside, where he discovers that in order to be considered a professional, one must be the last luchador standing in the ring at an upcoming free-for-all match. Ignacio gets in by disguising himself as a band member playing for the party, but does not know their material and improvises; Ramses finds Ignacio's performance annoying and ousts him. Attending the party causes Ignacio to fall behind on his responsibilities to the orphans, for which he angrily blames Steven, who retaliates by declaring he hates all orphans; they acrimoniously end their partnership.

Ignacio's secret is revealed to the entire monastery when his robe catches fire during mass, exposing his wrestling costume and forcing him to admit that he is a luchador. He declares that he intends to fight at a battle royale for the right to take on Ramses for a cash prize, which he will use to buy a bus for the orphans. During the match, wrestler Silencio ultimately emerges the victor after defeating Ignacio, who comes in second place. Ignacio is banished from the monastery, so he goes to live in the "wilderness", which is actually very close to the nearby village.

The next morning, Steven comes to tell him that Silencio has been injured and cannot fight, and that as the second-place finisher, Ignacio now has the right to fight Ramses; Ignacio and Steven agree to team up again. That night, Ignacio sends a message to Encarnación, explaining his plan and confessing his love to her.

Ignacio overcomes difficulty and manages to do well in the match, winning the crowd's support, but Ramses cheats and nearly wins until Ignacio sees Encarnación enter the arena with the orphans. Inspired by their support, Nacho rallies himself and defeats Ramses with a diving technique.

Ignacio becomes a professional wrestler and eventually manages to buy a bus for the orphans with his prize money; he then takes the orphans, Steven, and Sister Encarnación on a field trip to Monte Albán built by the Zapotec civilization. Ignacio, by now, has earned Encarnación's favor, as demonstrated by her signs of encouragement and his somewhat awkward acknowledgment thereof.

Cast
 Jack Black as Ignacio / Nacho, a Oaxaca monastery cook who dreams of becoming a luchador
 Troy Gentile as Young Ignacio 
 Ana de la Reguera as Sister Encarnación, a nun at the monastery
 Héctor Jiménez as Steven / Esqueleto, Ignacio's tag partner
 Silver King as Ramses, the luchador champion and Ignacio's idol
 Carla Jimenez as Cándida, a portly woman who tries to court Steven at the luchador's party
 Richard Montoya as Guillermo, a monk at the monastery
 Enrique Muñoz as Señor Ramon, Ramses' manager
 Moisés Arias as Juan Pablo
 Donald Chambers as Silencio, one of the wrestlers who defeats Nacho but is disqualified when Esqueleto runs over him, injuring his foot
 Darius Rose as Chancho
 Peter Stormare as Emperor, the local magic-man who claims that eating eagle eggs will give Ignachio the eagle's power
 Diego Eduardo Gomez as Chuy
 Human Tornado as El Snowflake, one of the luchadors who faces Nacho
 Mascarita Dorada as one of Los Duendes

Production
Black was a fan of the film Napoleon Dynamite and its director Jared Hess, and the two met in Los Angeles to discuss collaborating. Black was drawn to Hess' idea of a man of the Lord secretly living a life of violence via his love of lucha libre wrestling. While filming, Black sustained a gash on his eye after diving out of the wrestling ring during a stunt. He was rushed to the hospital but was able to continue filming. The film was shot entirely in Oaxaca, Mexico.

Music
Director Jared Hess originally wanted musical artist Beck to be behind the soundtrack for the film. Beck, being a fan of Hess, accepted. However, Paramount Pictures did not think Beck's style fit the movie, so composer Danny Elfman was brought in to replace him. Elfman then wrote a full score and recorded it in May 2006. However, only about 2/3 of Elfman's score ended up in the movie (with one of the songs, Ramses Suite, appearing in the released soundtrack). Due to how much of Elfman's music filled the film, Elfman's representatives asked that Elfman be the only person credited for the film's score. Hess caught wind of this and would not allow the studio to remove Beck from the credits. When finding that he would not have the only music credit, Elfman told Paramount to remove his name from the film. An agreement was eventually reached where both Beck and Elfman were credited for their respective parts of the score. However, Elfman appears with sole credit in the official billing block on promotional material.

Soundtrack
The track listing for the official soundtrack to Nacho Libre. The soundtrack was released October 24, 2006

 Hombre Religioso (Religious Man) - Mister Loco
 "A Nice Pile-Drive to the Face" (dialogue) - Jack Black
 Move, Move, Move - Alan Hawkshaw and Alan Parker
 Papas - Mister Loco
 Piel Canela (Singing at the Party) - Jack Black with Ismael Garcia Ruiz y Su Trio
 Ramses Suite - Danny Elfman
 "All the Orphans in the World" (dialogue) - Jack Black and Héctor Jiménez
 There is No Place in This World for Me - Beck
 "I'm Serious" (dialogue) - Jack Black
 10,000 Pesos - Beck
 Irene - Caetano Veloso
 Pump a Jam (Ramses) - Cholotronic
 Black is Black - Eddie Santiago
 Half Forgotten Daydreams - John Cameron
 Encarnación - Jack Black
 Tender Beasts of the Spangled Night - Beck
 Saint Behind the Glass - Los Lobos
 "Beneath the Clothes We Find the Man..." (dialogue) - Jack Black
 Forbidden Nectar - Jack Black and Mucho Macho Acapulco

Some songs that were not included on the soundtrack, but were in the movie, are "Mucha Muchacha" by Esquivel, "Bubblegum" by Mister Loco, "Holy Man" by Beck, "Bat Macumba" by Os Mutantes, and “La Llorona Loca” by Little Joe and the Latinaires.

Release and reception
The release date was originally set for May 2006, but was changed by Paramount to avoid competition from 20th Century Fox's X-Men: The Last Stand and one of Paramount's other films, Mission: Impossible III. It was then placed between the releases of Disney/Pixar's Cars (June 9) and Warner Bros. and Legendary Pictures' Superman Returns (June 28). It was released on DVD and Blu-ray on October 24, 2006. It was distributed in Switzerland, Spain, and the Netherlands by Universal Pictures.

During its opening weekend, Nacho Libre grossed $28,309,599, opening at #2 behind Cars second weekend. The total domestic box office stands at $80,197,993 and a worldwide total of $99,255,460.

The film received mixed reviews from critics. On Rotten Tomatoes, the film has an approving rating of 40% based on 166 reviews, with an average rating of 5.1/10. The website's critical consensus states: "At times hilarious, but other times offensive, director Jared Hess is unable to recapture the collective charisma of his Napoleon Dynamite characters, and instead, relies on a one-joke concept that runs out of steam. Sure to entertain the adolescents, however". Metacritic gave the film a score of 52 out of 100, based on 36 reviews, indicating "mixed or average reviews". Audiences polled by CinemaScore gave the film an average grade of "B+" on an A+ to F scale.

Roger Ebert of the Chicago Sun-Times wrote: "it takes some doing to make a Jack Black comedy that doesn't work, but Nacho Libre does it". Mick LaSalle of the San Francisco Chronicle thought the comedy was "hit and miss, with good bits interrupted by dead patches". Manohla Dargis of The New York Times gave it a positive review and called it "endearingly ridiculous".

Video game
A video game adaptation of the film was published by Majesco Entertainment and was released for the Nintendo DS. It is a cartoon-style wrestling game based upon the film.

Possible sequel
In November 2006, Jack Black, when asked, expressed his interest in a sequel: "I sure hope so, I love working with Jared. I think it's a good bet that we'll collaborate on something again. Mike had an idea that it would be Nacho goes to Japan, we'll see though." However, Jared Hess (who directed the film) revealed in October 2009 that Paramount had never approached him about doing a sequel to Nacho Libre, though he said he would "love to work with Black again".

Notes

References

External links

 
 
 
 

2006 films
2000s buddy comedy films
2000s sports comedy films
American buddy comedy films
American sports comedy films
2000s English-language films
2000s Spanish-language films
Films scored by Danny Elfman
Films about orphans
Films about religion
Films directed by Jared Hess
Films set in Mexico
Films shot in California
Films shot in Mexico
Films with screenplays by Mike White
Lucha libre films
Nickelodeon Movies films
Paramount Pictures films
Professional wrestling films
Sport wrestling films
2006 comedy films
American children's comedy films
2000s children's comedy films
Hispanic and Latino American comedy films
2000s American films
Spanish-language American films